Daniella Maria Giusti Barra (born 12 November 1981), known professionally as Dani Calabresa, is a Brazilian comedian, actress, screenwriter, and television presenter. She is best known for being a cast member of the APCA award winner show Comédia MTV  as well as the host, alongside the actor Bento Ribeiro, of Furo MTV, a show similar to Saturday Night Live Weekend Update. She was married to the comedian Marcelo Adnet. They got divorced in 2017. 
On March 18, 2013, Calabresa made her official debut on the weekly show Custe o Que Custar (a Brazilian version of the Argentine comedic news program Caiga Quien Caiga) aired on Band and TBS.

Career

Dani Calabresa is currently part of Globo TV's Zorra, a comedy show mainly composed of short sketches.

Filmography

Television

Movies

References

External links

Living people
1981 births
People from São Bernardo do Campo
Brazilian people of Italian descent
Brazilian television actresses
Brazilian women comedians
Actresses from São Paulo (state)
Brazilian television presenters
Brazilian women television presenters